The 2015 Fórmula Truck season was the 20th Fórmula Truck season. It began on March 1 at Caruaru and ended on December 6 at Londrina.

Calendar and results
On December 7, 2014 – the day of the final race of the 2014 season – the 2015 calendar was announced. All races were held in Brazil.

References

External links
  

2015 in Brazilian motorsport
2015